Matthew White (born 16 April 1970) is an Australian sports broadcaster, television executive, television presenter and journalist at Network 10, where he returned to in 2014. He has previously been Network 10's Head of Sport and host of the motorsports panel show RPM.

He previously worked at the Seven Network for a decade, where he was a host and commentator for various Seven Sport events, presented sport on Seven News Sydney, and presented current affairs program Today Tonight between 2008 and 2012.

Prior to joining Seven in mid-2004, he was originally at Network Network 10, where he was a host on the original Sports Tonight and was involved in the Australian Grand Prix, V8 Supercars, and Melbourne Cup coverage for the network.

Career
White began his journalism career at a local newspaper in Manly before moving to radio and joining Newcastle's NEWFM to present breakfast news. He moved to television in 1992 when he became weekend sports presenter for NBN News.

After another radio stint at Triple M, White joined Network Ten as a sport reporter. He became weekend host of the network’s flagship sports program Sports Tonight in 1993. During his time at Ten, White covered sports including Supercars, Big Bash League, Formula One, the Spring Racing Carnival and the AFL. He was a commentator for the Supercars in 2002 and 2003. He left Sports Tonight and Network Ten in mid-2004.

Move to Seven Sport

White joined the Seven Network in mid-2004 and became a major presenter in the Seven Sport stable. White was involved in the network’s Athens 2004 Olympics coverage, their Australian Open coverage, and was host of Seven’s (now-defunct) flagship sports program, Sportsworld. He also hosted evening events from Seven's main studio during the Beijing 2008 Olympics.

Following Seven attaining the Supercars rights in 2007, he hosted and commentated their coverage alongside Neil Crompton, Mark Skaife, Mark Larkham and Mark Beretta until mid-2014.

News and current affairs

Since arriving at Seven, White presented sport on Sydney's weeknight edition of Seven News, from mid-2004 until mid-2008.

On 13 August 2007, White joined Melissa Doyle as host of Sunrise filling in for David Koch. He filled in as co-host of Sunrise over the summer period, while David Koch was on holidays. White co-hosted alongside Melissa Doyle and Kylie Gillies. Additionally he presented weekend editions of Seven News in Sydney over the 2007/08 Christmas/New Year period.

On 30 September 2008, the Seven Network announced that White would replace Anna Coren as the presenter of the East Coast edition of Today Tonight. This meant he had to leave his regular position as sport presenter on Seven News, although he continued with his Supercars commitments. In November 2012, White resigned as presenter of Today Tonight after four years to pursue other roles at the Seven Network. In August 2013, White was appointed presenter of Seven Afternoon News with Melissa Doyle.

In 2009, White was a competitor on Dancing with the Stars while continuing his position at Today Tonight. He finished in second position. White hosted Carols in the Domain in 2012 with Natalie Barr and in 2013 with Melissa Doyle.

Return to Ten

In July 2014, White returned to Network 10 after spending a decade with the Seven Network. He covered the 2014 Commonwealth Games for Ten.

Following Ten winning the shared broadcast rights with Fox Sports to Supercars in 2015, White became a host of the network's coverage alongside Mark Webber and Aaron Noonan, as well as their Formula One coverage, replacing Greg Rust. White also hosts a revived version of the motorsports panel show RPM. He also hosts Wallabies Rugby Union matches on Ten.

White also is an occasional co-host on The Project.

In May 2018, White was appointed Head of Sport at Network 10, replacing David Barham.

In May 2020, it was announced that White had been made redundant from Network 10 due to a series of cutbacks by the network.

Personal life
White is married and has two children and lives in Sydney.

References

External links
Profile at Today Tonight

Seven News presenters
10 News First presenters
Australian television journalists
1970 births
Living people
Motorsport announcers
Australian sports journalists